Charles Lucy (July 1814 – 19 May 1873) was a British artist during the Victorian era who, while he was a talented portraitist, mainly focused on the history painting genre and whose work was mainly exhibited at the Royal Academy of Arts in London, England.

Early life 
Charles Lucy was born at Norton Canon, Herefordshire in England in July 1814 and according to family records, he was his parents' first born child. His family descended from the Lucys of Charlecote, Warwickshire, who afterwards settled in Worcestershire.

Charles Lucy had a natural affinity for painting. He spent his spare time painting anything he could get his hands on. As a child, he was even known to prepare his own colours and manufacture his own brushes. His memoriam in The Hereford Times noted that "his natural bent from a very early age was towards painting, and he began to practice it without instruction, until aided by friends, he devoted his life to art. With that view he decided to go to London to pursue his studies." At the early age of fifteen he was apprenticed to his maternal uncle, Price Griffiths, who was a chemist in Hereford, but he was so passionate about art that he would sneak a lantern into his room, so he could paint all night long.

Education 
He first studied at the Royal Academy of Arts in London, then in Paris under Paul Delaroche at the École des Beaux-Arts. In 1838, he returned to London to attend the Royal Academy of Arts as a student. Thereafter, Mr. Lucy spent two years studying paintings by Old Master in Paris and The Hague for a private patron. He also "pursued his studies in the Louvre and other great public galleries."

Career 
The "self-taught" young Mr. Lucy "commenced his career as a painter of portraits, his father being one of the earliest of his productions." According to family records, "he soon left his uncle's establishment, and became an earnest in the art in which he so ably succeeded; and for several years travelled in Belgium, France, and the Netherlands, and returned to England about the year 1836." Family writings revealed that "he then competed with Mr. Frost (who was also self-taught) for the gold medal of The Royal Academy of Arts, with his painting Prometheus Chained, which is now in the possession of the Philosophical Society at Hereford." According to family papers, "Mr. Frost obtained the prize, his picture being the more finished than that of Mr. Lucy, but the latter was generally looked upon as the bolder and more artistic work."

He is best known for his painting of The Landing of the Pilgrim Fathers, which is displayed in the National Heritage Museum in Lexington, Massachusetts, in the United States of America. His other notable work include his engravings of Oliver Cromwell and a painting called, The Burial of King Charles the First, in St. George's Chapel of Windsor Castle, which was sold by the London auction house, Bonhams, on October 11, 2006.

For sixteen years Mr. Lucy took up his residence in Paris, Barbizon and Fontainebleau, where he reared his children with his wife, Ann. He continued to maintain his connection with Hereford, of which, according to the Freeman's Roll, he was admitted a freeman on July 29, 1841, thereby bestowing Mr. Lucy with certain rights and privileges within his native city. But it was while he was in France that he executed several of his greatest works, before he returned to London, where he resided until his death.

Charles Lucy "painted historical subjects and some portraits, which were frequently engraved." He exhibited his first historical painting, "The Interview between Milton and Galileo," in 1840 at the Royal Academy of Arts in London. After his first historical painting, "The Interview between Milton and Galileo," was hung in 1840" at the Royal Academy of Arts in London, Mr. Lucy divided his time between England and France. He lived in Barbizon for 16 years, but rather than joining the landscape painters there, he chose to continue is focus on significant scenes in British history. In 1847, he painted “Embarkation of the Pilgrim Fathers in the Mayflower," (later retitled: "Departure of the Pilgrims from Delft Haven"), which won him a prize bestowed by Prince Albert at the prestigious Westminster Hall competition in London in the same year. It was also one of the first pieces to bring Mr. Lucy attention on the east side of the English Channel. It would not be long before, "he was a regular contributor to the fresco competitions for the New Palace of Westminster." In 1848, it too was exhibited it at the Royal Academy of Arts in London. Family records show that in 1838 Mr. Lucy "receiv[ed] considerable distinction and much practice as a rising artist [after he] obtained the Two Hundred Guineas Prize at the Exhibition of Cartoons in Westminster Hall, for his painting of The Pilgrim Fathers Embarking for America, which [resulted] in the late Sir Robert Peel taking great notice of him." Of all his work, Mr. Lucy is best known for his 1848 painting, The Landing of the Pilgrim Fathers A.D. 1620, which is currently displayed in the National Heritage Museum in Lexington, Massachusetts, in the United States of America. Thereafter, Mr. Lucy served as the elected chairman of the committee of the New British Institution since its foundation in 1869 and "for many years was instructor at a drawing and design school in Camden Town, which he founded along with Thomas Seddon, Cave Thomas and one or two others. Unfortunately, "owing to want of funds, not withstanding the good services it was doing, [the school] was subsequently handed over to the government."

Notable works

 The Landing of the Pilgrim Fathers, America A.D. 1620 (1848, National Heritage Museum; Lexington, Massachusetts)
 The Departure of the Pilgrim Fathers for America, A.D. 1620 (R.A.1847; Pilgrim Hall Museum; Plymouth, Massachusetts)
 Prometheus Chained (approximately 1836)
 The Interview between Milton and Galileo (exhibited in 1840, it was his first historical piece that he exhibited)
 Departure of the Pilgrims from Delft Haven (1847; Originally entitled: Embarkation of the Pilgrim Fathers in the Mayflower)
The Burial of King Charles the First (1857)
Oliver Cromwell's Last Interview with his Favourite Daughter (1857, Engraving)
Oliver Cromwell Resolving to Refuse the Crown (1858)
The Babes in the Wood (1859; also known as Children in the Wood)
Noontide Repose (1869)
The Parting of Lord and Lady William Russell (1872)
Lord Say and Sele before Jack Cade
Napoleon On Board the Orient
The Man of Ross Portioning a Bride
Marie Corday on her way to Execution
The Forced Abdication of Mary Queen of Scots
The Arrest of Hampden and his Friends by order of Charles I. when leaving for America
Lord Nelson in the Cabin of the 'Victory
Devotion
Portrait of Mr. John Bosley (the last finished work of Mr. Lucy, according to family records)

Special notes of distinction 

 Many of Charles Lucy's works were purchased for public institutions in The United States of America, such as the National Heritage Museum in Lexington, Massachusetts and Pilgrim Hall Museum; Plymouth, Massachusetts.
 His works are in the collections of the Duke of Manchester and Sir Robert Peel, while engravings of his works were frequently made.
 He was commissioned by the late Sir Joshua Walmesley to paint a series of portraits of famous men, including Oliver Cromwell, Nelson, Richard Cobden, John Bright, W. E. Gladstone, Disraeli, Joseph Hume, and Mr. Garibaldi, which were bequested by Mr. Walmesley to the South Kensington Museum.
 Mr. Lucy's painting, Embarkation of the Pilgrim Fathers in the Mayflower, (later retitled: Departure of the Pilgrims from Delft Haven), won him a prize bestowed by Prince Albert at the prestigious Westminster Hall competition in London in 1847.
 His work was exhibited at The Royal Academy of Arts throughout his career.
 HIs unwavering artistic integrity was acknowledged by The London Times in a Thursday 9 May 1867 article covering The Exhibition of The Royal Academy of Arts, in which his work was displayed. According to this article, Charles Lucy "abides by the determination to treat grave historical incident gravely nowadays runs the risk of poor remuneration, whether is the way of pence or praise ; and Mr. Lucy is conspicuous among the courageous few who, in this cause, have braved the risk of small gain and slight recognition from the distributors of artistic distinctions and public employment."
 The Illustrated London News also noted Mr. Lucy's artistic integrity in a June 7, 1873 article on his passing: "Mr. Lucy was a worthy painter of our English school, who through life devoted himself, at the sacrifice of many opportunities of immediate gain, and despite much un merited discouragement, to the highest branches of historical painting."

Fatal illness and death 
Charles Lucy's memoriam in The Hereford Times noted that "his illness was of long standing, having begun some ten years ago; and for the past four years has been steadily gaining upon his vital powers," which "prevent[ed] him from executing many commissions offered to him." Ultimately, Mr. Lucy died from a complication of diseases, including cancer of the liver, which caused him severe suffering for four weeks until his demise, but that he endured "with his usual and quiet fortitude of spirit." A week before he passed, his death seemed imminent from water overflowing the heart, but the crisis rather brought relief in the bursting of a small tumour on the liver. Mr. Lucy "was not conscious of the fatal nature of his illness, and almost to the [very end] expressed his conviction that he would soon recover and be able to 'go down to Hereford' in order to take sittings of Mr. Rankin for the Memorial Portrait, which he had been selected to execute." He was resilient until the very end, passing "away from his agonies without a sigh or a struggle; while pressing the loved hands which he held, his breathing ceased and all was over." The Hereford Times memorandum of Mr. Lucy noted that John Henry Foley, "the eminent sculptor, has taken a cast of the head and face of the deceased, whose fine expressive features are described as singularly beautiful in death." However, whether Mr. Foley made a sculpture of this cast remains to be seen.

Charles Lucy passed away in his residence, 13 Ladbroke Crescent, in Notting Hill, London on 19 May 1873 at the age of fifty-eight. He was to have turned 60 in July of the same year. He left behind "a sorrowing widow, Ann-the daughter of the late Mr. Thomas Bishop, town councillor of Hereford, and a large family." Lucy's funeral took place on Saturday, May 24, 1873 at one o'clock in the afternoon at Highgate Cemetery. His grave (no.2363) on the western side of the Cemetery, is now derelict and there is no visible inscription.

The estate sale of his studio's contents included unsold paintings and was held at the London auction house, Christie's, on the 4th and 5 June 1875.

 Family members 
 His father was also named Mr. Charles Lucy, who was born in 1780 and died in Hereford in 1871 at the age of 91.
His maternal uncle was Mr. Price Griffiths, a chemist in Hereford.
His wife was Ann Lucy and they had children together.
His eldest child with Ann was Charles Hampden Lucy, was also an artist. His works include portraits of his own sons entitled H. Lucy (1890) and John Charles Hampden Lucy (1890).
His grandsons were H. Lucy and John Charles Hampden Lucy.
His father-in-law (Ann's father) was Mr. Thomas Bishop, town councillor of Hereford
 His uncle-in-law (Ann's uncle) was Mr. Edward Pritchard', solicitor and treasurer of Herefordshire

References

External links
 Charles Lucy family portraits
All the Mighty World: The Photographs of Roger Fenton, 1852–1860, exhibition catalog fully online as PDF from The Metropolitan Museum of Art, which contains material on Charles Lucy (see index)
The Lucy Family website

1814 births
1873 deaths
19th-century English painters
English male painters
History painters
Burials at Highgate Cemetery
19th-century English male artists